Regional League Eastern Division is the 3rd Level League in Thailand. It was formed in 2009 along with other four other regional leagues, all playing at the same level. The winner of each regional league enter the Regional League Championships to determine the three teams that will receive promotion to the Thai Division 1 League.

League History

Formed in 2009, 12 clubs applied to be part of the new setup; Ayutthaya, Cha Choeng Sao, Lopburi, Nakhon Nayok, Prachuap Khiri Khan, Ratchaburi, Rayong, Rose Asia Pathum Thani, Samut Prakan, Saraburi, Singburi and Thai Summit.

Lopburi, Ratchaburi and Samut Prakan were the only teams with previous experience in the Thai football league system.

Samut Prakan won the first championship, winning the title on the final day of the season, they had matched Ayutthaya neck and neck all season long.

Timeline

Championship History

Member clubs

 

 
Cen
Sports leagues established in 2009
2009 establishments in Thailand